The Netball Singapore Nations Cup  is an annual netball tournament organised and hosted by Netball Singapore. The inaugural tournament was played in 2006 and was won by Singapore. The host nation and Northern Ireland are the tournament's most successful teams, both winning two tournaments each.

Tournaments

Finals

Winners by nation

Main sponsors

References

 
 
2006 establishments in Singapore